Theater Schachar was a private Jewish theatre in Hamburg, Germany, which existed from 1998 to 2004. The theatre was founded in 1998 in Hamburg by graphic artist and playwright Daniel Haw.

References

Jews and Judaism in Hamburg
Theatres in Hamburg